Iziaslav of Kiev may refer to:

 Iziaslav I of Kiev (1024–1078), patronymic Yaroslavich
 Iziaslav II of Kiev (1096–1154), patronymic Mstislavich
 Iziaslav III of Kiev (died 1162), patronymic Davidovich
 Iziaslav IV Vladimirovich (born 1186)

See also
 Zaslavsky
 Iziaslav (disambiguation)